(JAA) was a subsidiary of Japan Airlines (JAL) which existed between 1975 and 2008. JAA was headquartered in the Japan Airlines Building in Shinagawa, Tokyo.

JAA was established as a wholly owned subsidiary of JAL on 8 August 1975 and given the responsibility of providing air links between Japan and Taiwan, formerly offered by JAL.

Direct flights between Japan had been suspended since April 1975, following the signing of a civil air treaty with the People's Republic of China. However, following negotiations between the Interchange Association, Japan and Taiwan's Association of East Asian Relations, JAA was created and direct flights to Taipei were resumed.  JAA began flights to Taipei on September 15, 1975.

Similar arrangements were later made by Air France, British Airways, KLM, Qantas and Swissair for their services to Taiwan.

In 1985, JAA was headquartered in the Yurakucho-Denki Building in Chiyoda, Tokyo, in a facility separate from the JAL headquarters in the Tokyo Building in Chiyoda.

Following JAL's privatization, the new 2007 Japan-Taiwan air transport agreement led JAL to liquidate JAA as a cost-saving measure and to normalize Japan-Taiwan flight status. JAA flew its last flights on March 31, 2008, and all flights were operated by JAL from April 1, 2008.

Destinations 

Routes served by JAA before being folded into JAL:

Taiwan Taoyuan International Airport -- Narita International Airport
Taiwan Taoyuan International Airport -- Kansai International Airport
Taiwan Taoyuan International Airport -- Chubu Centrair International Airport
Kaohsiung International Airport -- Narita International Airport

The above routes were all taken over by JAL on April 1, 2008.

Historically, JAA even offered Taipei -- Okinawa, Taipei -- Hong Kong, and Taipei -- Manila routes under the Fifth Freedom traffic rights granted by Taiwan, as well as the connection flights between Taipei and Kaohsiung before the direct Narita—Kaohsiung route was inaugurated in August 2005. JAA was to date the only international carrier to be granted the right to fly in-island by the Civil Aeronautics Administration (Republic of China).

Fleet 

The Japan Asia Airways fleet consisted of the following aircraft before its integration to Japan Airlines:

Boeing 767-300
Boeing 747-300
Boeing 747-100
Boeing 747-200
McDonnell Douglas DC-8-62H
McDonnell Douglas DC-10-40

Beginning in 2004, most JAA flights were operated with JAL Boeing 747-400 aircraft to meet market demand and to improve JAL fleet utilization. Previously, JAA operated Douglas DC-8-53/61, Boeing 747-100/200 and McDonnell Douglas DC-10-40 aircraft.

See also
Foreign relations of Taiwan#Air links
British Asia Airways
KLM Asia
Australia Asia Airlines
Swissair Asia
Air France Asie

References

External links

 Japan Asia Airways (Archive)
Japan Asia Airways Fleet Detail

Japan Airlines
Defunct airlines of Japan
Defunct airlines of Taiwan
Airlines established in 1975
Airlines disestablished in 2008
Former Oneworld affiliate members
1975 establishments in Japan
1975 establishments in Taiwan
2008 disestablishments in Japan
2008 disestablishments in Taiwan
Airline companies based in Tokyo